Oyana may refer to:
 Alternative name of the Wayana language.
 A dialect of the Gadsup language, Oyana.